Sobekemsaf (sbk-m-z3=f; “Sobek is his protection”) is an ancient Egyptian theophoric name, popular during the Second Intermediate Period (mainly in the 17th Dynasty). Although it is grammatically masculine, it was also used for women; it was common during this era that the gender of a name did not correspond to that of its bearer.

Notable bearers
 Pharaoh Sobekemsaf I
 Pharaoh Sobekemsaf II
 official of the 13th Dynasty Sobekemsaf
 Queen Sobekemsaf, wife of Nubkheperre Intef
 Princess Sobekemsaf C, daughter of Queen Sobekemsaf
 [Sobek?]emsaf A, mother of Pharaoh Rahotep

Sources

Ancient Egyptian given names
Theophoric names